A Long View of Canadian History was a Canadian historical television miniseries which aired on CBC Television in 1959.

Premise
The series concerns Canadian history and consists of a discussion between historian Donald Creighton and political scientist Paul Fox, both professors at the University of Toronto. Two hours of film were recorded from their five-and-a-half-hour conversation, which in turn was edited to fit two half-hour episodes which aired at 10:30 p.m. (Eastern) on 16 and 30 June 1959.

CBC's Publication Branch published the text of this conversation in book form that year.

References

External links
 

CBC Television original programming
1959 Canadian television series debuts
1959 Canadian television series endings
Black-and-white Canadian television shows